Janusz Józefowicz (born 3 July 1959, Świecie) is a Polish director, choreographer, actor and dancer. He was the director of the musical Metro during both its original Polish production and its run on Broadway.

Education

Józefowicz is a graduate of the State Higher School of Theatre, Warsaw (now the Aleksander Zelwerowicz National Academy of Dramatic Art). His graduate production, Misbehaving, was created in 1984.

Józefowicz studied dance at the Vocal and Dance School in Koszecin, and in Prague, under the dance professor . In 1990, Józefowicz received a six-week choreography scholarship from the United States government.

Career 
His musical Metro had its premiere on January 30, 1991 at the Dramatyczny Theater in Warsaw, then in 1992 at the Minskoff Theater on Broadway and on October 22, 1999 in Moscow at The Bolshaya Opereta. In 1995 METRO was successfully performed in France. The play was nominated for the Tony Award for the best score. In 1994 it was awarded the Golden Record award, in 1997 – Platinum Record and in 1998 with double Platinum Record. METRO became the most successful event of the season and it is still performed at the Studio Buffo Theater. It has been performed more than 1,980 times in Poland, has been seen by over 2,500,000 spectators.

Janusz Józefowicz was a director and a choreographer of several other original musicals: "Peter Pan”, “Romeo and Juliet”, “Miss Tutli Putli” and many adaptations: “Witches of Eastwick” (Moscow), Prophet (Minsk), “Halka”, “Zemsta nietoperza”, “Krakowiacy i Górale”, “Dama od Maxima” (TV theater). His most recent undertaking was directing and making choreography to Roger Waters’ opera “Ca Ira”. In December 2011 he directed musical “Polita” in which, for the first time on stage, 3D live technique was used.

In 1992 Janusz Józefowicz became the artistic director of Studio Buffo Ltd. Józefowicz personally takes part (singing and dancing) in his shows.

Janusz Józefowicz developed fundamentals of musical team, in which sang: Katarzyna Groniec, Anna Frankowska, Barbara Melzer, Beata Wyrąbkiewicz, Anna Mamczur, Edyta Górniak, Robert Janowski, Mariusz Czajka, Michał Milowicz, Dariusz Kordek, Olaf Lubaszenko, Bogusław Linda and others.

Janusz Józefowicz has choreographed nearly 50 musical shows (including more than twenty shows for Polish public television)

Awards 

 International Journalists’ Award for Misbehaving (1984)
 Bull of Success – for extraordinary achievements in art (1991)
 The Journalists’ Award for Achievements in The Stage Art (1993)
 Master Diploma award (1998)
 Golden Mask (1999/2000) – best director in all kinds of theater.
 Prometheus award (2001)
 Silver medal of Gloria Artis (2014)
 The Legend of the Musical (2014) – for laying the foundations of modern musical history in Russia
 Stanisław Wyspiański Award

Works

Films 
· Miłość Ci wszystko wybaczy as a dancer (tap dancing)- 1981

· Blisko, coraz bliżej - 1982-1986

· C.K.Dezerterzy as a soldier - 1985

· Pewnego letniego dnia - 1985

· Bohater roku as a ballet master - 1986

· Trójkąt Bermudzki as a guy of the stag night - 1987

· Nowy Jork, czwarta rano as Józek Polański - 1988

· Oszołomienie as a dancer - 1988

· Kraj Świata as a nervous man in chain - 1993

· Gracze as Jan Gracz - 1995

· Sztos as Adaś, Eric's friend - 1997

· Poranek kojota as Dziki, mafia boss - 2001

· Superprodukcja as Paweł Dziobak - 2002

· Małgosia contra Małgosia - 2008

· Sztos 2 - 2011

Television 
· musical METRO – TVP 1, POLONIA

·revue NEW YEAR'S EVE (31 DECEMBER 2005/2006) - TVP 1

· opera CA IRA – TVP 1 (25 August 2006)

· PRZEBOJOWA NOC – musical show, 10 episodes (September – December 2007)

· ZŁOTA SOBOTA – musical show, 8 episodes (December 2007 – February 2008)

· CONCERT – METRO x 1000 – TVP 1, POLONIA  (30 May 2000)

· DO GRAJĄCEJ SZAFY GROSIK WRZUĆ – TVP 1, POLONIA (June 1993)

· GROSIK 2 – TVP 1, POLONIA

· TYLE MIŁOŚCI – TVP 1, POLONIA

· BAJOR AT BUFFO – TVP 1, POLONIA

· OBOK NAS – TVP 1, POLONIA

· PRZEŻYJ TO SAM – TVP 1, POLONIA

· KATARZYNA GRONIEC concert  – TVP 2, POLONIA

· „DAMA OD MAXIMA” George Feydean, music Ryszard Sielicki, TVP 1, POLONIA

· JANUSZ JÓZEFOWICZ ZAPRASZA – 4 shows for TVP 1, POLONIA

· A couple of season’s inaugurations and closings in Regional Television – WOT

· Charity concerts – Regional Television - WOT

· NOC Z GWIAZDAMI czyli SYLWESTER W JEDYNCE in 1997, 1998, 1999, 2000, 2005

· „OD TANGA DO TANGA” – TVP 1, POLONIA

· GALA in Wrocław  - ALFABET JÓZEFOWICZA ( 14  March 1999) – TVP 2

· GALA in Wrocław – NIEDZIELA NA GŁÓWNYM (18 March 2001) –TVP 2

· ZIMY ŻAL  director M. Umer – TVP 1 (1989)

· BIG ZBIG SHOW  director M. Umer – TVP 1 (1992)

· ZIELONO MI  director M. Umer – TVP 1 (28 June 1997)

·musical ROMEO & JULIA (dir. Janusz Józefowicz)

Theatre 
· MISBEHAVING (1984) Ateneum Theater, director A. Strzelecki

· BREL, Ateneum Theater, director W. Młynarski

· HEMAR, Ateneum Theater, director W. Młynarski

· WYSOCKI, Ateneum Theater, director W. Młynarski

· CABARETRO, Rampa Theater, director A. Strzelecki

· SWEET FIFTIES, Rampa Theater, director A. Strzelecki

· RED TABLE, Rampa Theater, director A. Strzelecki

· MUSIC-THERAPY, Rampa Theater, director A. Strzelecki

· ZIMY ŻAL (1988), Rampa Theater, director M. Umer

· BIG ZBIG SHOW, Rampa Theater, director M. Umer

· METRO (30 January 1991), Dramatyczny Theater in Warsaw, director J. Józefowicz

· METRO (16 April 1992), Minskoff Theatre, director J. Józefowicz

· METRO (22 October 1999), Moskowskaja Opereta, director J. Józefowicz

· MEIN KAMPF, Ateneum Theater in Warsaw

· WIDOWS, Współczesny Theater in Warsaw

· KUBUŚ FATALISTA, Ateneum Theater in Warsaw

· MOLIER M. Błuhakow, Osterwy Theater in Lublin

· PANNA TUTLI PUTLI, Współczesny Theater in Wrocław

· POZEGNANIE JESIENI, Słowackiego Theater in Kraków

· WITWEN, Theater in Vienna, director Erwin Axer

· DYBUK, Theater in Tel Awiev

· HALKA S. Moniuszko (16 December 1995), Great Theater in Warsaw, director Maria Fołtyn

· OTELLO  Giuseppe Verdi (3 November 1998), Theater am Goetheplatz in Bremen, director Andrzej Woron

· DEAD SOULS Gogol, Berlin, director Andrzej Woron

· MAHAGONY Bertolt Brecht & Kurt Weil, Volksbühne in Berlin, director A. Woron

· THE END OF THE BEGINNING, Współczesny Theater in Warsaw

· TANGO Sławomir Mrożek ( 23 May 1997), Polski Theater in Szczecin, director Stanisław Świder

· TANGO Sławomir Mrożek ( 14 June 1997), Współczesny Theater in Warsaw, director M. Englert

· PASTORAŁKI GÓRALSKIE – concert (December 1996), Great Theater in Warsaw, director J. Józefowicz

· DIABŁY POLSKIE Zbigniew Książek, Polski Theater in Szczecin

· OGRODY CZASU Federic Garcia, Polski Theater in Szczecin

· CZTERY KOTY, CZYLI PIES Z KULAWĄ NOGĄ, Polski Theater in Szczecin

· PAN TADEUSZ  Adam Mickiewicz (29 September 1996), Polski Theater in Szczecin, director Bartłomiej Wyszomirski

· LATAJĄCY CYRK MONTY PYTHONA, Polski Theater in Szczecin, director A. Opatowicz

· ZEMSTA Aleksander Fredro, Polski Theater in Szczecin, director J. Józefowicz

· WESELE Stanisław Wyspiański (September 2000), Polski Theater in Szczecin, director J. Józefowicz

· DO GRAJĄCEJ SZAFY GROSIK WRZUĆ (June 1993), Theater in Opole, director J. Józefowicz

· GROSIK 1 (4 September 1993), Studio Buffo, director J. Józefowicz

· NIE OPUSZCZAJ MNIE... ( 7 January 1994), Studio Buffo, director J. Józefowicz

· BAJOR AT BUFFO (6 April 1994), Studio Buffo, director J. Józefowicz

· WIELKOLUDY Andrzej Maleszka ( 7 May 1994), Studio Buffo, director O. Stokłosa

· GROSIK 2 (27 February 1995), Studio Buffo, director J. Józefowicz

· TYLE MIŁOŚCI (16.03.1996), Studio Buffo, director J. Józefowicz

· ZBIGA ŻAL (14.05.1996), Studio Buffo, director M. Umer

· OBOK NAS (24.10.1997), Studio Buffo, director J Józefowicz

· KATARZYNA GRONIEC – concert (28.03.1998), Studio Buffo, director J. Józefowicz

· CRAZY FOR YOU George Gershwin & Ken Ludwig (29.01.1999), Roma Theater, director W. Kępczyński

· PRZEŻYJ TO SAM (17.04.1999), Studio Buffo, director J. Józefowicz

· PETER PAN (27.02.2000), Roma Theater, director J. Józefowicz

· 1000 x METRO (30.05.2000), Dramatyczny Theater in Warsaw, director J. Józefowicz

· NIEDZIELA NA GŁÓWNYM (18.03.2001), Polski Theater in Wrocław, director J. Józefowicz

· NIEDZIELA NA GŁÓWNYM (29.04.2001), Studio Buffo, director J. Józefowicz

· UKOCHANY KRAJ... czyli PRL w piosence (19.02.2002), Studio Buffo, director J. Józefowicz

· WITCHES OF EASTWICK (13.03.2003), Kinoaktora Theater in Moscow, director J. Józefowicz

· WIECZÓR CYGAŃSKI (16.10.2002), Studio Buffo, director J. Józefowicz

· WIECZÓR ŻYDOWSKI (22.10.2002), Studio Buffo, director J. Józefowicz

· WIECZÓR ROSYJSKI (26.04.2003), Studio Buffo, director J. Józefowicz

· PANNA TUTLI PUTLI (17.05.2004), Studio Buffo, director J. Józefowicz

· musical ROMEO AND JULIET (8.10.2004), COS Torwar, director J. Józefowicz

· WIECZÓR WŁOSKI (18.02.2005), Studio Buffo, director J. Józefowicz

· WIECZÓR FRANCUSKI (16.11.2005), Studio Buffo, director J. Józefowicz

· ZEMSTA NIETOPERZA J. Strauss (18.12.2005), Opera Krakowska, director J. Józefowicz

· ROMEO AND JULIET at Buffo (23.02.2006), Studio Buffo, director J. Józefowicz

· URSUS 1976 – concert (25.06.2006), Pl. Konstytucji in Warsaw, director J. Józefowicz

· CA IRA R. Waters (25.08.2006), Poznań, director J. Józefowicz

· AMERICAN EVENING (22.09.2006), Studio Buffo, director J. Józefowicz

· musical PROPHET (30.08.2007), Kupala Theater in Minsk, director J. Józefowicz

· opera KRAKOWIACY I GÓRALE (27.10.2007), Opera Narodowa, director J. Józefowicz

· LATINO EVENING (14.02.2008), Studio Buffo, director J. Józefowicz

· BRITISH EVENING (25.01.2009), Studio Buffo, director J. Józefowicz

· KARUZELA MARZEŃ (27.03.2009), Studio Buffo, director J. Józefowicz

· POLISH EVENING (11.11.2009), Studio Buffo, director J. Józefowicz

· BALKAN EVENING (23.11.2010), Studio Buffo, director J. Józefowicz

· musical POLITA (4.12.2011), Bydgoszcz, Hala Łuczniczka, director J. Józefowicz

· musical POLITA – the world's first performance in 3D (31.12.2011), Torwar, Warsaw, director J. Józefowicz

· musical POLA NEGRI –  (18.12.2013), Дворец Культуры имени Ленсовета, Sankt Petersburg, director J. Józefowicz

· RUSSIAN EVENING 2 (26.02.2014), Studio Buffo, director J. Józefowicz

· musical POLA NEGRI –  (17.09.2014), Центральный Академический Театр Российской Армии, Moscow, director J. Józefowicz

· musical  JULIETTA & ROMEO –  (19.11.2014), Дворец Культуры имени Ленсовета, Sankt Petersburg, director J. Józefowicz

Discography 

 Metro (1991)
 Grosik 2 (1995)
 Tyle Miłości (1996)
 Grosik 3 (1998)
 Niedziela na głównym (2001)
 Możesz zostać Julią (2004)

References

Polish male film actors
Polish theatre directors
1959 births
Living people
Polish choreographers
Polish male dancers
Aleksander Zelwerowicz National Academy of Dramatic Art in Warsaw alumni